(pl. In modern Greek usage, it corresponds to the rank of Field Marshal.

Byzantine Empire 

In this use it is for instance used to describe the famed literary hero Digenis Akritas, or famous past commanders, such as Belisarius.

Modern Greece 

In modern Greek history, the title retains the connotation of a victorious commander, and has been used unofficially for the two most successful Greek field commanders of the Greek War of Independence: Theodoros Kolokotronis in the Morea (Peloponnese) and Georgios Karaiskakis in Roumeli (Central Greece). 

As a technical term, it is also used to render in Greek the rank and dignity of field marshal. In this capacity, the rank was first awarded to King Constantine I in 1913, following the victorious Balkan Wars. It was awarded again to his son, King George II, in 1939, and was held ex officio by his successors, Paul and Constantine II up to the abolition of the Greek monarchy in 1973–74. These kings also held the equivalent ranks in the navy and air force. 

Apart from the reigning monarchs, only one professional officer has been awarded the rank: General Alexandros Papagos, who was awarded it on 28 October 1949 in recognition of his services during the Greco-Italian War and the Greek Civil War.

In addition, Lieutenant General Theodoros Grivas was bestowed the rank on 23 October 1862 for his leadership in the revolt that led to the ousting of King Otto, but died the following day, before it could be conferred to him in person.

The rank has not been retained by the current Third Hellenic Republic.

See also 

 Strategos
 Stratelates
 Greek military ranks
 Hellenic Army officer rank insignia

References 

Military ranks of Greece
Marshals
 
Byzantine military offices
Greek words and phrases